Delicate Gravity (Délicate Gravité) is a short film directed by Philippe Andre and written by Philippe Andre and Daniel Hainey. It won Best of Festival Award at the Palm Springs International Short Film Festival 2013, Best of the Festival and Fest Foreign Film at the Nevada City Film Festival, Audience Choice Award at Bermuda International Film Festival. It has been part of the Unifrance edition of French Cinema in Russia. It has been eligible to the Academy Awards for Oscars.

Plot
Paul receives an emotional message from Claire. He can hear the deep sadness behind her words and believes she might commit suicide. But Paul does not know Claire. This is a message left on the wrong man’s phone, a message that will lead Paul to a brief encounter with Claire.

Cast
Yvan Attal as Paul
Anne Parillaud as Claire
Jade Phan-Gia as The Waitress
Gregoire Bonnet as Man in the lobby
Tadrina Hocking as Voice on the phone

Music 

 Jóhann Jóhannsson : Fordlandia 
 Jóhann Jóhannsson : Joi & Karen
 Chromatics : Broken Mirrors
 The XX : Fantasy

Awards

 Best of Festival Award at Palm Springs International Short Film Festival 2013 

 Best of the Festival and Fest Foreign Film at the Nevada City Film Festival 2013 

 Audience Choice Award at Bermuda International Film Festival 2014

Selections 

 Cannes Short Film Corner 2013
 Flickers Rhodes Island International Film festival 2013
 The Portobello Film Festival 2013
 The Bermuda International Film Festival 2014
 Newport Beach Film Festival 2014
 37th Portland International Film festival 2014
 New York City Film Festival 2014

Critical reception
Variety, Hollywood Reporter, French toast sunday,Way too indie, Just Celebrity,Female First, Critical movie critics,
Back to the movies, Vulture Hound, Film Shortage, Following the Nerd, Indie Wire, Los Angeles Times,
Palm Springs Life, Directors Note

External links

 
 Delicate Gravity on IMDb